Limnodriloides adversus is a species of clitellate oligochaete worm, first found in Belize, on the Caribbean side of Central America.

References

Further reading

Erséus, Christer. "Mangroves and marine oligochaete diversity." Wetlands Ecology and Management 10.3 (2002): 197-202.
Gustavsson, Lena M., and Christer Erséus. "Morphology and phylogenetic implications of oesophageal modifications in the Limnodriloidinae (Oligochaeta, Tubificidae)." Journal of Zoology 248.4 (1999): 467-482.

External links
WORMS

Tubificina
Taxa named by Christer Erséus